Hayes & Harlington is a railway station serving the west London districts Hayes and Harlington in the London Borough of Hillingdon.

It has long operated as a minor stop on the Great Western Main Line and is at the start of a spur to Heathrow Airport, to and from which passenger trains operate since the early 21st-century building of the spur which benefits from a flyover junction.

The station is managed by Transport for London, with most services provided by the Elizabeth line, between London Paddington and Reading or Heathrow.

History

The station is on the Isambard Kingdom Brunel-designed Great Western Main Line landscaped and laid from London Paddington to major towns in central and west Berkshire, Bristol, South Wales and with later direct additions to Birmingham and Taunton. The line was opened piecemeal; its first guise terminated on 4 June 1838 at a temporary  station in Taplow to allow completion of the single-span brick high-level sounding arch over the Thames just west of that temporary halt.  The station at Hayes opened in 1868 or 1864.

The service was discontinued as uneconomic on 30 September 1885.

The film Trains at Hayes Station, showing trains passing through the station with stereophonic sound, was filmed from the roof of the defunct Aeolian pianola factory just north of the station. The factory had been purchased by HMV when the pianola company had collapsed owing to fraud and technological obsolescence. The film is almost the first demonstration of stereophonic sound to accompany moving pictures, an invention of Alan Blumlein.

Description
The station has five platforms, four being through platforms and one being a terminus bay platform. Platforms 1 and 2 are only used during certain engineering works and during disruption on the relief lines; 3 and 4 are for services (which are stopping services) to and from London, Heathrow Airport,  and Oxfordshire; platform 5 is a bay terminus platform, which was used for half-hourly shuttle services to Paddington. Platform 5 is capable of holding an eight-car train; platforms 2, 3 and 4 can hold nine-car trains and platform 1 can hold five-car trains. Platforms 3 and 4 have been extended as part of Crossrail improvement works. All platforms are connected with a footbridge to the new station building as part of the new Crossrail station improvements, which include step-free access to all platforms, step-free access to Station Road and Station Approach/High Point Village. All lines at Hayes & Harlington are electrified.

Airport Junction
Airport junction adjoins the station the junction of the short Heathrow Airport branch. For this reason, the lines through the station are electrified with 25 kilovolt A.C. overhead power from London Paddington to the airport – the main line to  has been electrified by  early 2018 as part of a project to modernise the main line.

The junction itself, west of the station, consists of two high-speed turnouts from the main lines, the 'down' (away from London) line curving away to the left towards the Airport and the 'up' (towards London) line passing over a concrete flyover to clear (flyover) the up and down main lines. The construction permits London-bound electric trains to join the main line at the same time as westbound expresses serve the down main line.

Services

Trains at Hayes & Harlington are operated by Great Western Railway and Elizabeth Line.

Frequency
The Monday-Saturday off-peak service is:
 8tph to 
 2tph to 
 2tph to 
 2tph to Heathrow Terminal 4
 2tph to Heathrow Terminal 5

The Sunday service is:
 6tph to 
 2tph to Heathrow Terminal 4
 2tph to Heathrow Terminal 5

Oyster "pay as you go" as well as contactless can be used for journeys originating or ending at Hayes & Harlington.

Service table

Elizabeth line

In the future, using new tunnels under Central London, trains will continue to Abbey Wood station in southeast London and eventually Shenfield in the east.

Elizabeth line upgrades 
Various alterations have been made by Network Rail to prepare the station for Crossrail:

 New station building
 Four new lifts to provide step-free access
 Platforms 1–4 extended
 New  bay platform 5 constructed (replacing existing bay)
 New platform canopies to platform 4 and 5
 Track work to widen the island platform 2 and 3 and to provide access to the new bay platform

Locale
Harlington is a green-buffered enlarged village whose south is the Bath Road which has major hotels as part of a cluster of Heathrow Airport Hotels the settlement merges into Hayes in the north which has two retail/regular commercial centres, the closer High Street area immediately adjoins the station and continues due north, a similar further hub is the Uxbridge Road found  further to the north.

Connections
Buses serving the station are numbers 90, 140, 195, 278, 350, E6, H98, U4, U5, X140, N140 and school buses 696, 698. The letter abbreviations are for Ealing, Hounslow, Uxbridge, Express and Night services.

References

External links

 News of Crossrail’s 2014 planning application
 Clip of Trains at Hayes Station (1935)

Railway stations in the London Borough of Hillingdon
Former Great Western Railway stations
Railway stations in Great Britain opened in 1868
Railway stations served by Great Western Railway
Railway stations served by the Elizabeth line
Great Western Main Line